Carlos Lamar (born 14 December 1908, date of death unknown) was a Cuban fencer. He competed in the individual and team épée events at the 1948 Summer Olympics.

References

1908 births
Year of death missing
Cuban male fencers
Olympic fencers of Cuba
Fencers at the 1948 Summer Olympics
Sportspeople from Matanzas
Pan American Games medalists in fencing
Pan American Games bronze medalists for Cuba
Fencers at the 1951 Pan American Games
20th-century Cuban people